Josué Mitchell (born November 11, 1989) is a Costa Rican professional football forward.

Career
Mitchell played in Guatemala with Coban Imperial and moved back to the country to Sololá in 2022. Between those spells he had returned to Costa Rica to play again for Pérez Zeledón.

International career
Mitchell was called up by coach Oscar Ramirez for friendly matches in March 2018 against Scotland and Tunisia in preparation for the 2018 FIFA World Cup. 
He made his debut for the Costa Rica national football team on March 27, 2018 in the friendly match against Tunisia at the Allianz Riviera Stadium in Nice, France. He entered as a substitute in the final quarter of the game.

References

1989 births
Costa Rican footballers
Living people
Association football forwards